The Music of Nashville: Season 2, Volume 1 is the third soundtrack album for the American musical drama television series Nashville, created by Academy Award winner Callie Khouri and starring Connie Britton as Rayna Jaymes, a legendary country music superstar, whose stardom begins fading, and Hayden Panettiere as rising teen star Juliette Barnes. The album was released on December 10, 2013 through Big Machine Records, with tracks 14-17 available on the Target deluxe edition.

Track listing

Deluxe edition

Charts

Weekly charts

Year-end charts

References

Television soundtracks
Music of Nashville: Season 2, Volume 1
Country music soundtracks
Big Machine Records soundtracks
2014 soundtrack albums